Badri Venkatesh (born 2 May 1974) is an Indian film director and television professional of work experience in film direction, film writing, television fiction writing, reality show direction, event direction, and film making, cinematic teaching, creative management, novel writing and short fiction film making. Venkatesh made his directorial debut with the 2010 Tamil film Baana Kaathadi.

Career 
Venkatesh won the National award for his short film, VIdiyalai Nokki, which also is the first Tamil short fiction film to win this accolade.

Venkatesh's popular works include screenplay and direction for the Tamil feature film Baana Kaathadi, released in 2010 and starring Atharvaa, Samantha, and Prasanna.

Apart from mainstream Tamil cinema, Venkatesh has been credited for leading a large number of TV shows including Nalaya Natchathiram Thangamazhai and Amul Super Kudumbam which is a wide-ranging mix of reality shows. He is also directing Miss South India, who is a beauty pageant for all 4 South Indian States.

Venkatesh hails from the Nesapakkam district of Chennai. He is well known as the show director of the popular Celebrity Cricket League (3rd Edition), and the Mirchi Music Awards, the biggest Music awards in South India and various other events in South India.

Badri Venkatesh is back to feature films after a hiatus with the Atharvaa starrer Semma Botha Aagathey (2018). The long-delayed comedy-entertainer Plan Panni Pannanum starring Rio Raj and Remya Nambeesan was released in December 2021.

Filmography

References

External links

Film directors from Chennai
Tamil film directors
Tamil-language film directors
Tamil screenwriters
Living people
1974 births
20th-century Indian film directors
21st-century Indian film directors